Mission: Impossible III (Music from the Original Motion Picture Soundtrack) is the soundtrack album for the 2006 film Mission: Impossible III, composed by Michael Giacchino. Unlike the previous two films in the series, there was no album released containing the film's contemporary music.

Overview
After J. J. Abrams signed on to direct Mission: Impossible III, he brought many of his frequent collaborators onto the production. One of which was composer Michael Giacchino, who became attached to write the musical score in early 2005. "[It was] not just me, but [Abrams'] editors, the writers, the production designer," said Giacchino. "It's really a group of friends, which is the greatest thing about working with him. It makes me feel like I'm 10 again, making movies in the backyard with my friends."

The score for Mission: Impossible III was recorded over the course of eight days at the Sony Scoring Stage in Culver City, California. It featured a 112-piece orchestra conducted by Tim Simonec. The scoring session attracted numerous star personalities, including Jennifer Garner and Merrin Dungey (from J. J. Abram's Alias), Sarah Vowell (from The Incredibles), Dermot Mulroney, as well as Tom Cruise, who conducted the orchestra in the "MI Theme".

Rapper Kanye West recorded and release a single for the soundtrack called "Impossible" featuring Twista and Keyshia Cole, which served as the film's theme song in addition to the original Mission: Impossible theme.

Track listing

Personnel
Credits adopted from liner notes:

Production
Michael Giacchino – composer, producer
Lalo Schifrin – original material
J. J. Abrams – executive producer
Danny Bramson – executive producer, music supervisor
Robert Townson – executive producer for Varèse Sarabande
Hollywood Studio Symphony – orchestra
Reggie Wilson – orchestra contractor
Matthew Joseph Peak – CD package design

Technical
Dan Wallin – recording, mixing
Stephen M. Davis – supervising music editor
Alex Levy – music editor
Alan Schlaifer – assistant music editor
Paul Apelgren – music editor coordinator
Greg Lookorn – music technical engineer
Mark Eshelman – music floor person
Bryan Clements – music floor person
Erick Labson – mastering

Orchestration
Tim Simonec – orchestration, conductor
Peter Boyer – orchestration
Harvey R. Cohen – orchestration
Mark Gasbarro – orchestration
Jack Hayes – orchestration
Larry Kenton – orchestration
Chris Tilton – orchestration
Chad Seiter – score assistant
Andrea Datzman – score assistant
Booker T. White – music preparation
Adam Michalak – music recordist

Acoustic Instruments
 Peter Erskine - drums, percussion
 Abraham Laboriel - electric bass
 Michael Giacchino - grand piano
 Mark Gasbarro- keyboards

Additional music
Additional music featured in Mission: Impossible III:

References

Action film soundtracks
Mission: Impossible music
Varèse Sarabande soundtracks
2006 soundtrack albums
Michael Giacchino soundtracks
Mission: Impossible (film series)